Bishop Mackay-Smith House, also known as the Franklin School, is a historic residence located in the Rittenhouse Square West neighborhood of Philadelphia, Pennsylvania. It was built in 1903–1904, and is a -story, brick and brownstone building. It has a flat, square facade front with a deep entry porch. It was designed by noted Philadelphia architect Theophilus Parsons Chandler, Jr. (1845–1928). It was built for Alexander Mackay-Smith, Bishop of Pennsylvania in 1911. He served as Coadjutor Bishop from 1902 to 1911.

The house was added to the National Register of Historic Places in 1980.

References

Houses completed in 1904
Houses on the National Register of Historic Places in Philadelphia
Houses in Philadelphia
Rittenhouse Square, Philadelphia